The Dead Betties is an American, Brooklyn, New York-based rock band composed of lead singer–bassist Joshua Ackley, drummer Derek Pippin, and guitarist Eric Shepherd. With albums on Warner Music, Chainsaw and Heartcore Records, and video rotation on MTV and VH1, the band is best known for their intense songwriting, melodic impact and explosive performances. Appearances at CBGB, Cake Shop, North 6, Knitting Factory and headlining slots on nationwide and international tours and festivals between 2004 and 2008—(Homo-a-Gogo (Olympia, Washington), SXSW (Austin, Texas), CMJ (New York City), and NXNE (Toronto, Canada))—The Dead Betties reached a broader audience.

While the band puts the finishing touches on its forthcoming album, lead single "The Way We Live Now" received 5 out of 5 stars from About.com's Ryan Cooper. "The Way We Live Now" shares its name with the Susan Sontag short story and is an ode to civil rights pioneers from the 1980s. The single includes two other original tracks and three covers; "Blood" by Babes in Toyland, Britney Spears' "Lucky", and Madonna's "Angel", a long-standing favorite of the band.

"The Way We Live Now" also received praise from The Deli, while the video for "Lucky" was written up in Huffington Post and the video for "Angel" was premiered by Huffington Post and shared by Out Magazine.

Recordings 
Sleeper (EP, 2002, Thorobred Records)
Relic (EP, 2003, Thorobred Records)
The Dead Betties (EP, 2004, Thorobred Records)
Summer of '93 (Full-length, 2006, Heartcore/Chainsaw Records)
Nightmare Sequence (Full-length, 2007, Cordless Records/WMG)
"Destination I Do" / "Malls of the Midwest" (7" vinyl single, 2007, WMG)
F U A, You're In The Army Now (Full-length, 2007, Thorobred Records, WMG)
This is My Brain on Drugs (Full-length, 2008, Thorobred Records)

References

Further reading 
Pop Matters – Review by Dara Kartz of The Dead Betties Nightmare Sequence (Cordless Records (Warner))
Review of Nightmare Sequence
Review of F.U.A You're in the Army Now
Review of The Way We Live Now(About.com)
Review of The Way We Live Now (Deli Magazine)

External links
The Dead Betties Homepage Official site.

Dead Betties, The
Dead Betties, The
Dead Betties, The
Musical groups established in 2002
2002 establishments in New York City